Matt Ryder is a British musician. Born in Birmingham, Ryder is now based in London.

On 3 December 2021, Ryder released the EP Escape. On 5 August 2022, Ryder released Riverbed. The song features vocals from both Ryder and Birdy.

Discography

Singles 

 Not The Same (2020)
 A New Way Home (2021)
 Lips (2021)
 Riverbed (2022)

References 

Musicians from Birmingham, West Midlands

Living people
Year of birth missing (living people)